Schistura latifasciata is a species of ray-finned fish, a stone loach, in the genus Schistura from the Mekong basin in Yunnan.

References

L
Fish described in 1985